Rick Calabash (sometimes credited as Rick Schneider, was born in Wheeling, West Virginia) is an American film and television producer, writer and director, particularly of animated family films.

As a teen, Calabash once worked for Mister Rogers' Neighborhood, for whom he designed and built theatrical sets.

His first break in the entertainment industry came from producer, David Kirschner, for whom he developed many television and feature film projects during Kirschner's tenure as president of Hanna-Barbera Productions.

When Kirschner formed Turner Feature Animation, Calabash joined the team as a storyboard supervisor, character designer and writer, working on such films as The Pagemaster, which starred Christopher Lloyd and Macaulay Culkin and the Annie Award winning animated feature Cats Don't Dance, which starred Scott Bakula and Hal Holbrook with original songs by Randy Newman and Natalie Cole.

Notable television productions for which Calabash served as producer, writer, and director are Disney's 101 Dalmatians: The Series, for which he received two Emmy nominations  and won a Silver Angel Award, Disney's House of Mouse and Disney's Mickey Mouse Works for which he won a Golden Reel Award.  He also served as a storyboard supervisor and director on the two highest-grossing home video releases of 2001 and 2002, Mickey's House of Villains and Mickey's Magical Christmas: Snowed in at the House of Mouse.

In addition to his work in television and film, he was a storyboard artist and creative consultant on the popular theme park attraction Mickey's PhilharMagic, a 3-D musical featurette, which premiered on the largest screen in the world at the Walt Disney World Resort in 2003, followed by installations at Hong Kong Disneyland, Tokyo Disneyland, Disneyland Paris, and Disney's California Adventure in 2019.

Calabash was formerly the president of Scarab Productions, Inc., a film, television and new media production company which has projects in development with The Disney Channel, The Zanuck Company, Johnny Depp's Infinitum Nihil and Warner Bros. Pictures.

Calabash is currently an executive at the Zanuck Company, in charge of its family film division, Zanuck Family Entertainment.

Filmography

Producer 
 Disney's 101 Dalmatians: The Series (1997)

Writer 
 Disney's House of Mouse (2000)
 Disney's Mickey Mouse Works (1999)
 Cats Don't Dance (1997)

Director 
 Mickey's House of Villains (2002)
 Mickey's Magical Christmas (2001)
 Disney's House of Mouse (2000)
 Disney's Mickey Mouse Works (1999)
 Disney's 101 Dalmatians: The Series (1997)

Consultant, supervisor, or other 
 The Zero Theorem (2013)
 Alice in Wonderland (2010)
 Get Low (2009)
 Charlie and the Chocolate Factory (2006)
 Big Fish (2003)
 Mickey's PhilharMagic (2003)
 Mickey's House of Villains (2002)
 Mickey's Magical Christmas (2001)
 Disney's House of Mouse (2000)
 Disney's Mickey Mouse Works (1999)
 Cats Don't Dance (1997)
 The Pagemaster (1994)
 Fish Police (TV series) (1992)
 Steven Bochco's Capitol Critters (1992)
 Jetsons: The Movie (1990)
 Gravedale High (1990)
 Tom & Jerry Kids (1990)
 Wake, Rattle, and Roll (1990)

Awards and nominations

 Emmy Awards

Outstanding Children's Animated Program
1998 101 Dalmatians: The Series (Nomination)
1999 101 Dalmatians: The Series (Nomination)

 Angel Awards

Award of Excellence Outstanding Children's Television Program
1998 101 Dalmatians: The Series (Won)

 Golden Reel Awards

Outstanding Achievement in the Motion Picture & Television Industries
2000 Disney's Mickey Mouse Works (Won)

References

External links
 
 Rick Schneider at Studio System
 Encyclopedia of Disney Animated Shorts
 Angel Awards

Year of birth missing (living people)
Living people
American television directors
Writers from Wheeling, West Virginia
West Liberty University alumni
Art Institute of Pittsburgh alumni